This list comprises all players who have participated in at least one league match for Albany BWP Highlanders (formerly Albany Blackwatch Highlanders and Albany Admirals) since the team's first season in the USL Premier Development League in 2003. Players who were on the roster but never played a first team game are not listed; players who appeared for the team in other competitions (US Open Cup, etc.) but never actually made an USL appearance are noted at the bottom of the page where appropriate.

A
  Jhonny Arteaga

B
  Devlin Barnes
  Jonah Baskin
  Chris Bennice
  Chad Binney
  Steve Blackwell
  Nick Bochette
  Josh Bolton
  Christoher Breedlove
  Matthew Brooks
  Oral Bullen
  Colin Burns

C
  Scott Cannon
  Daniel Capecci
  Peter Cappiello
  Nicholas Cardillo
  Travis Carey
  David Catrow
  Earl Chase
  Greg Chevalier
  Matthew Chew
  Kyle Clancy
  Ryan Clancy
  Dillon Colucci
  Jonathan Cook
  Travis Cooke
  Stephen Croft

D
  Bryan Degnan
  Corey Dempsey
  Ilir Disha
  Todd Driscoll
  Adrian Dubois

F
  Matthew Flaherty
  Steve Freeman

G
  Jordan Germano
  Paul Gerstenberger

H
  Jason Henderson
  Brian Holdenbrand

J
  Jordan James
  Matt Jones

K
  Kenneth Kelley
  Andrew Knoll

L
  Tim Larocca
  Logan Lee
  Justin Leskow
  Brian Levey
  Dede Lleshi
  Caio Lopes De Silva

M
  Jonathan Mabee
  Tebias Mason
  Michael McCallion
  Dane Mellon
  Robert Millock
  Kenneth Murray
  Ptah Myers

N
  Matthew Narode
  Barry Neville
  Kyle Nicholson

P
  Matt Pecheone
  Ryan Pierce
  Joshua Piscitelli
  Brian Pope
  Derek Popovich
  Steven Procknal
  Kevin Purcell

R
  Jason Ramundo
  Jason Reed
  Chris Riley
  Daniel Riso
  Matthew Romano
  Kevin Russell

S
  Elliott Savitz
  Brian Scruton
  Peter Sgueglia
  Rob Sgueglia
  Robert Shutterworth
  Jake Slemker
  Nick Southworth
  Marc Stencel
  Kyle Stepanovsky
  Dan Stevens
  Matthew Sullivan
  Ben Swann

U
  Benjamin Utter

V
  Gregory Victor
  Joseph Vitale

W
  Dwayne Whylly
  James Whyte
  Maikel Wiesnekker
  Allister Wiltshire
  Ted Wolfson
  Patrick Wren

Sources
 

Albany BWP Highlanders
Albany BWP Highlanders players
Association football player non-biographical articles